Hell for Sure Lake is an Alpine lake located in the John Muir Wilderness, which is part of the Sierra Nevada mountain range. The Hell for Sure trail and Hell for Sure Pass both are named after this lake with the region being known for its rough terrain. The rocks the surround Hell for Sure Lake and its nearby mountains are estimated to be over 100 million years old.

Nearby Lakes 
Within the Red Mountain basin there are a few lakes that are close to Hell for Sure Lake including Horseshoe Lake, Disappointment lake, and Devil's Punchbowl.

See also
List of lakes in California

References

Lakes of the Sierra Nevada (United States)
Lakes of Fresno County, California
Sierra National Forest